Platyptilia morophaea is a moth of the family Pterophoridae. It is known from Ethiopia and Kenya.

References

morophaea
Moths of Africa
Moths described in 1920